Gesualdo Piacenti (born 15 July 1954 in Trevi nel Lazio) is an Italian former footballer who played as a midfielder. He made 123 appearances in the Italian professional leagues. He played one season in Serie A for Roma (1977–78), making 14 appearances.

References

1954 births
Living people
Italian footballers
Association football midfielders
Serie A players
S.P.A.L. players
A.C. Monza players
A.S. Roma players
Delfino Pescara 1936 players
U.C. Sampdoria players
Parma Calcio 1913 players
Serie B players